The 2007 ICC EAP Cricket Trophy (International Cricket Council East Asia Pacific Cricket Trophy) is an international cricket tournament that forms part of the ICC World Cricket League. It was played in Auckland, New Zealand from 2 to 8 December 2007, and forms part of the qualification structure for the 2011 Cricket World Cup.

Teams

The top two teams from the tournament will qualify for Division Five of the World Cricket League in Jersey in May 2008.

Squads

Group stage

Points Table

Fixtures and results

Final and Playoffs
The final and playoffs originally scheduled for 8 December were cancelled, in favour of replaying abandoned matches from 6 December.

Final Placings

Statistics

See also

2006 ICC EAP Cricket Trophy
World Cricket League EAP region

References

External links
 ICC East Asia Pacific Trophy (Auckland Cricket Association)
 ICC-EAP Cricket Trophy 2007 (Japan Cricket Association)
 East Asia Pacific Trophy 2007 (CricketEurope)
 Player Profiles (Japan Cricket Association)

International cricket competitions in 2007
ICC EAP Cricket Trophy